The 1910 Italian Athletics Championships  were held in Milan. it was the 5th edition of the Italian Athletics Championships.

Champions

References

External links 
 Italian Athletics Federation

Italian Athletics Championships
Italian Athletics Outdoor Championships
1910 in Italian sport